Lee Chang-hoon may refer to:

 Lee Chang-hoon (athlete) (1935–2004), Korean former long-distance runner
 Lee Chang-hoon (actor) (born 1966), South Korean actor
 Lee Chang-hoon (footballer) (born 1986), South Korean football player